Paratus is a genus of araneomorph spiders in the family Liocranidae, containing five species restricted to India, Sri Lanka and China.

Species
Paratus halabala Zapata & Ramírez, 2010 – Thailand
Paratus hamatus Mu & Zhang, 2018  – China
Paratus indicus Marusik, Zheng & Li, 2008 – India
Paratus kentingensis Mu & Zhang, 2018 – Taiwan
Paratus longlingensis Zhao & Peng, 2013 – China
Paratus perus Sankaran, Malamel, Joseph & Sebastian, 2017 – India
Paratus reticulatus Simon, 1898T – Sri Lanka
Paratus sinensis Marusik, Zheng & Li, 2008 – China

References

Liocranidae
Spiders of Asia
Araneomorphae genera